Li Qinfeng (born 26 December 1989), known by her pen name , is a Taiwanese-born fiction writer, translator and essayist, who writes in Mandarin and Japanese. Her Japanese novel Hitorimai (Solo Dance) received the 60th Gunzo New Writers' Award for Excellence in 2017. In 2021, her novel Higanbana ga saku shima (An Island Where Red Spider Lilies Bloom) won the 165th Akutagawa Prize.

Early life
Li was born in Taiwan and her native language is Chinese. She began studying Japanese at the age of 15. In 2013, she moved to Japan to study at Waseda University and has been living there since.

Li Qinfeng is a pen name. "Li" is derived from a piece of Chinese classical literature, "Three Lis in Ci (詞中三李)", which refers to three famous Chinese poets Li Yu, Li Bai and Li Qingzhao. "Qin (琴)" is pronounced as "Koto" in Japanese, which is a word she has always liked. "Feng (峰)" is derived from a Chinese poem by Wang Guowei.

Writing
In 2017, Li's work Solo Dance was awarded the Gunzo Prize for New Writers. She is known for addressing LGBT topics in her work and has been interviewed for her representation of same-sex relationships between women. Li became the first Taiwanese writer to win the Akutagawa Prize in 2021, for her work "An Island Where Red Spider Lilies Bloom".

Works

In Japanese
Solo Dance (独り舞, Hitorimai, 2018)
Count to Five and the Crescent Moon (五つ数えれば三日月が, 2019)
Moon and Starlight Night (星月夜（ほしつきよる）, 2020)
The Night of the Shining North Star (ポラリスが降り注ぐ夜, 2020)
An Island Where Red Spider Lilies Bloom (彼岸花が咲く島, 2021)
Celebrating Life (生を祝う, 2021)

In English
 Solo Dance, trans. Arthur Reiji Morris, World Editions, 2022,

References

Citations

Works cited

External links

21st-century Taiwanese women writers
21st-century Taiwanese writers
Taiwanese expatriates in Japan
National Taiwan University alumni
Waseda University alumni
1989 births
Living people
Taiwanese translators
Taiwanese women essayists
Taiwanese women novelists
Taiwanese novelists
Pseudonymous women writers
Taiwanese people of Hoklo descent
21st-century pseudonymous writers
Akutagawa Prize winners